Vatica flavovirens is a species of plant in the family Dipterocarpaceae. It is a tree endemic to Sulawesi in Indonesia. It is a critically endangered species threatened by habitat loss.

References

flavovirens
Endemic flora of Sulawesi
Trees of Sulawesi
Critically endangered flora of Asia
Taxonomy articles created by Polbot